Lennox Waldron Williams (12 November 1859 – 8 July 1958) was an eminent   Anglican  priest, the sixth
Bishop of Quebec. 
 Born into an eminent ecclesiastical family and educated at St John's College, Oxford, he was  ordained in 1885.  His first post was a curacy at  St Matthew's, Quebec after which he was successively Rector, Rural Dean, Dean of Montreal and finally, in 1915, Bishop of Quebec- resigning in 1935.

Notes

See also 
List of Bishop's College School alumni

1859 births
1958 deaths
People from Saffron Walden
Alumni of St John's College, Oxford
Bishop's College School alumni
Bishop's College School Faculty
Deans of Montreal
Anglican bishops of Quebec
20th-century Anglican Church of Canada bishops